The 2018 NRL Touch Premiership season is the inaugural season of the NRL Touch Premiership in Australia, and coincided with matches in the 2018 NRL season. The premiership was launched in partnership with Touch Football Australia and the National Rugby League, and was made up of a three round regular season split into two conferences - Queensland and New South Wales - with the first-placed teams in both conferences progressing to the grand final.

Teams 
The premiership included six teams in its inaugural season, extracted from the 2018 Elite 8 Series. Each team was aligned to a current NRL club, and was made up of players selected by Queensland Touch Football and NSW Touch Football based on their performances at the 2018 National Touch League.

Regular season 
The regular season was broken into two conferences, consisting of three teams each - Cowboys, Titans, and Broncos in the Queensland conference and Eels, Knights, and Tigers in the NSW conference.

Round 1

Round 2

Round 3 

(*) Denotes referee debut

Grand final 
The grand final is played between the first-placed team in the Queensland conference, and the first-placed team in the New South Wales conference.

References

Touch competitions
Touch Premiership season